The United States Military Academy (USMA) is an undergraduate college in West Point, New York that educates and commissions officers for the United States Army. This list is drawn from alumni of the academy who became university educators or administrators, such as Dennis Hart Mahan (class of 1824), George Washington Custis Lee (class of 1854), Dwight D. Eisenhower (class of 1915), and Wesley Posvar (class of 1946).



Academics
Note: "Class year" refers to the alumni's class year, which usually is the same year they graduated. However, in times of war, classes often graduate early.

References
General

Inline citations

West Point
Academy alumni, famous list
United States Army officers
Ac